The Podlaskie Voivodeship was formed in 1513 by Sigismund I the Old as a voivodeship in the Grand Duchy of Lithuania, from a split off part of the Trakai Voivodeship. After Lithuania's union with the Kingdom of Poland in 1569 and formation of the Polish–Lithuanian Commonwealth, the voivodeship was transferred to the Polish Crown, where it belonged to the Lesser Poland Province of the Polish Crown.

History
In ca. 1274, the historical Podlachia region was added to the Grand Duchy of Lithuania. In 1391, the King of Poland and Grand Duke of Lithuania Jogaila attempted to transfer the region to Duke Vytautas' brother-in-law, Janusz I of Warsaw, Duke of Masovia, but from 1413 on Podlaskie was managed as part of Lithuania's Trakai Voivodeship.

Formation 
After the administrative reform of 1514, Podlaskie was isolated from Trakai Voivodeship as a separate voivodeship, with the capital at the town of Drohiczyn. It originally consisted of the following former Trakai lands: Drohiczyn, Mielnik, Bielsk, and Brest Litovsk. In 1566 based on Brest Litovsk lands, the separate Brest Litovsk Voivodeship was formed.

In 1569, King of Poland and Grand Duke of Lithuania Sigismund II Augustus transferred Podlaskie voivodeship, together with the Kiev, Volhynian and Bracław Voivodeships to the Polish Crown. Podlaskie remained part of Poland until the Partitions of Poland.

Zygmunt Gloger gives the following description of Podlasie Voivodeship:"Historic Podlasie stretched from north to south for some 30 miles, and was located between Mazovia and Rus principalities of Brzesc and Grodno (...) It was a sparsely populated province, covered by dense forests, with four major rivers: the Biebrza, the Narew, the Bug and the Krzna. Due to population growth in Mazovia and Rus, Podlasie became a settlement area - Mazovians settled near Tykocin, Rajgrod and Goniadz, while Ruthenians settled near Bielsk Podlaski. In northern districts of Podlasie, near Augustow, the Yotvingians resided (...) After the 1241 Mongol invasion of Poland, Podlasie turned into a desert, with population decimated by Asiatic hordes. Poles did not return here until the late 13th century, despite the fact that the province was already controlled by the Grand Duchy of Lithuania (...)

King Sigismund I the Old created Podlasie Voivodeship, which was part of Lithuania, but in 1569 was transferred to Poland, after the Union of Lublin (...) After the third partition of Poland, most of the voivodeship was annexed by the Kingdom of Prussia. When in 1815, Congress Poland was divided into new provinces, the Podlasie Voivodeship was re-created, but it covered only a small part of Podlasie itself, together with areas belonging to historic Mazovia, Polesie and Lesser Poland. As a result, boundaries of Podlasie proper changed.

In the Polish–Lithuanian Commonwealth, the voivodeship had two senators, who were the voivode and the castellan of Podlasie. It was divided into three lands, those of Drohiczyn, Bielsko and Mielnik. Each land had its own regional government, and elected two envoys to the Sejm. Furthermore, the voivodeship sent two deputies to the Lesser Poland Tribunal at Lublin or Radom".

Aftermath 

In 1795, most of it was taken over by the Kingdom of Prussia as part of New East Prussia, but these lands were later part of the Duchy of Warsaw. Then, parts of it belonged to Congress Poland or the Russian Empire until 1915.

Administrative Subdivisions
The Voivodeship consisted of the following ziemias:
 Bielsk Land, Bielsk). Local sejmiks took place in Bielsk, where the szlachta elected two deputies of the Sejm,
 Drohiczyn Land, Drohiczyn). Local sejmiks took place in Drohiczyn, electing two deputies of parliament,
 Mielnik Land, Mielnik). Local sejmik took place in Mielnik, where two deputies were elected.

Heraldry

The emblem of the region is connected by two arms of Polish and Lithuanian – an eagle without a crown on a red field, and Lithuanian knight.

Voivodes

The governor of the Podlaskie Voivodeship was first located in Bielsk Podlaski, but later moved to Drohiczyn.

Voivodes included 
Iwan Sapieha (ur. ok. 1450, zm. 1517) 1513 – 1517
Janusz Kostewicz (ur. 1468, zm. 1527) 1520 – 1527
Iwan Sapieha (ur. 1486, zm. 1546) 1529 – 1541
Mikołaj Pac (ur. 1497, zm. 1551) 1543 – 1551
Mikołaj Narbutt (zm.1555) 1551 – 1555
Paweł Sapieha (zm. 1579) 1555 – 1558,also the Voivode of smoleński
Bazyli Tyszkiewicz (ur. 1492, zm. 1571) 1558 – 1569, also the Voivode of smoleński
Mikołaj Kiszka (ur. 1524, zm. 1587) 1569 – 1587
Stanisław Radzymiński (ur. 1552, zm. 1591) 1588 – 1591
Janusz Zasławski (ur. 1561, zm. 1629) 1591 – 1604, also the Voivode of wołyński
Tomasz Gostomski (ur. 1569, zm. 1623) 1605 – 1605, also the Voivode of mazowiecki
Jan Zbigniew Ossoliński (ur. 1555, zm. 1623) 1605 – 1613, also the Voivode of sandomierski
Jan Wodyński ( zm. 1616) 1613 – 1616
Stanisław Warszycki (ur. 1577, zm. 1617)  1616 – 1617
Wojciech Niemira (zm. 1625) 1617 – 1625
Andrzej Chądzyński (ur. 1561, zm. 1631) 1625 – 1631
Paweł Szczawiński (zm. 1634) 1633 – 1634
Stanisław Niemira (ur. 1597, zm. 1642/48) 1634 – 1648
Paweł Warszycki (zm. 1660) 1649 – 1652, also the Voivode of mazowiecki
Prokop Leśniowolski (ur. 1588, zm. 1653) 1652 – 1653
Jan Piotr Opaliński (ur. 1601, zm. 1665) 1653 – 1661, also the Voivode of kaliski
Wojciech Emeryk Mleczko (ur. ok. 1625, zm. 1673) 1665 – 1673
Wacław Leszczyński (ur. 1626, zm. 1688) 1673 – 1688
Marcin Oborski 1688 – 1698
Stefan Mikołaj Branicki (ur. 1643, zm. 1709) 1699 – 1709
Stanisław Mateusz Rzewuski (ur. 1660, zm. 1728) 1710 – 1728, also the Voivode of bełski, hetman polny koronny
Michał Józef Sapieha 1728 – 1738
Karol Józef Hiacynt Sedlnicki 1738 – 1745, also podskarbi wielki koronny
Michał Antoni Sapieha (ur. 1711, zm. 1760) 1746 – 1752, also podkanclerzy litewski
Michał Józef Rzewuski (ur. 1699, zm. 1770) 1752 – 1762
Bernard Stanisław Gozdzki (ur. 1704, zm. 1771) 1762 – 1771
Antoni Miączyński (ur. 1691, zm. 1774) 1771 – 1774
Józef Salezy Ossoliński (ur. 1744, zm. 1797) 1774 – 1790
Tomasz Aleksandrowicz (ur. 1735, zm. 1794 1790 – 1794

References

 Podlasie Voivodeship by Zygmunt Gloger

Former voivodeships of Grand Duchy of Lithuania
Voivodeships of the Polish–Lithuanian Commonwealth
1513 establishments in Lithuania
1795 disestablishments in the Polish–Lithuanian Commonwealth